Philippe Sollers (born Philippe Joyaux; 28 November 1936) is a French writer and critic. In 1960 he founded the avant garde literary journal Tel Quel (along with writer and art critic Marcelin Pleynet), which was published by Le Seuil and ran until 1982. Sollers then created the journal L'Infini, published first by Denoel, then by Gallimard with Sollers remaining as sole editor.

Sollers was at the heart of the period of intellectual fervour in the Paris of the 1960s and 1970s. He contributed to the publication of critics and thinkers such Jacques Derrida, Jacques Lacan, Louis Althusser, and Roland Barthes. Some of them were later described in his novel Femmes (1983), alongside other figures of French intellectualism active before and after May 1968.

His writings and approach to language were examined and praised by French critic Roland Barthes in his book Writer Sollers.

Biography
Sollers was born as Philippe Joyaux In Talence, France, where his family ran the Société Joyaux Frères, the iron factory Recalt producing material for kitchens, metal constructions and machines for the aircraft manufacturer SNCASO under the German military administration in occupied France during World War II. His parents were Octave Joyaux and Marcelle Molinié. He moved to Paris in 1955, studied at the Lycée privé Sainte-Geneviève of Versailles and at the ESSEC Business School.

Sollers married Julia Kristeva in 1967.

Work

Following his first novel, A Strange Solitude (1958), hailed by François Mauriac and Louis Aragon, Sollers began, with The Park (1961) the experiments in narrative form that would lead to Event (Drame, 1965) and Nombres (1968). Jacques Derrida analyzed these novels in his book Dissemination. Sollers then attempted to counter the high seriousness of Nombres in Lois (1972), which featured greater stylistic interest through the use of wordplay and a less formal style. The direction taken by Lois was developed through the heightened rhythmic intensity of non-punctuated texts such as Paradis (1981).

Sollers's other novels include Women (1983), Portrait du joueur (1984), Le coeur absolu (1986), Watteau in Venice (1991), Studio (1997), Passion fixe (2000), L'étoile des amants (2002), which have introduced a degree of realism to his fiction, in that they make more explicit use of plot, character and thematic development. They offer the reader a fictional study of the society in which he or she lives by reinterpreting, among other things, the roles of politics, media, sex, religion, and the arts.

Controversies
In 1990, following a televised disagreement between Canadian novelist Denise Bombardier and the French writer Gabriel Matzneff over Matzneff's "recently published memoir, about his sexual conquests of very young women", a few days later, on the TV channel France 3, Sollers referred to Bombardier as "a bitch".

Bibliography

Essays
 Agent secret, Mercure de France, 2021
 "Complots" – Gallimard, 2016
 "Portraits de femmes" – Flammarion, 2013
 "Fugues" – Gallimard, 2012
 "Discours Parfait" – Gallimard, 2010
 "Vers le Paradis" – Desclée de Brouwer, 2010 (with DVD)
 "Guerres secrètes" – Carnets nord 2007
 "Fleurs" – Hermann éditions 2006
Dictionnaire amoureux de Venise, 2004
 "Mystérieux Mozart" – Plon 2001
 "Mysterious Mozart" – University of Illinois Press, 2010
 "Éloge de l'Infini" – Gallimard, 2001
 "Francis Ponge" – Seghers éditions, 2001
 "Francesca Woodman" – Scalo Publishers 1998
 "Casanova l'admirable" – Plon 1998
 "Casanova the Irresistible" – University of Illinois Press, 2016
 "La Guerre du Goût" – Gallimard, 1994
 "Liberté du XVIIIème" (Extract from La Guerre du Goût) – Gallimard, 2002
 "Picasso, le héros" – Le cercle d'art 1996
 "Les passions de Francis Bacon" – Gallimard 1996
 "Sade contre l'Être suprême" – Gallimard 1996
 "Improvisations" – Gallimard, 1991
 "De Kooning, vite" – La différence 1988
 "Théorie des Exceptions" – Gallimard, 1985
 "Sur le Matérialisme" – Seuil, 1974
 "L'Écriture et l'Expérience des Limites" – Seuil, 1968
 Writing and the Experience of Limits – Columbia University Press, 1982
 "Logiques" – Seuil, 1968
 "L'Intermédiaire" – Seuil, 1963
 Le Défi – c.1958 (awarded Fénéon Prize, 1958)

Novels
Légende - Gallimard, 2021 
Désir - Gallimard, 2020
Le Nouveau - Gallimard, 2019
Centre – Gallimard, 2018
 Beauté – Gallimard, 2017
 Mouvement – Gallimard, 2016
 L'École du Mystère – Gallimard, 2015
 Médium – Gallimard, 2014
 L'Éclaircie – Gallimard, 2012
 Trésor d'Amour – Gallimard, 2011
 Les Voyageurs du temps – Gallimard, 2009
 Un vrai roman, Mémoires – Plon 2007
 Une Vie Divine – Gallimard, 2006
 L'Étoile des Amants – Gallimard, 2002
 Passion Fixe – Gallimard, 2000
 Un amour américain – Mille et une nuits, 1999
 Studio – Gallimard, 1997
 Le cavalier du Louvre, Vivant Denon – Plon 1995
 Le Secret – Gallimard, 1993
 La Fête à Venise – Gallimard, 1991
Watteau in Venice -Scribner's, 1994
 Le Lys d'Or – Gallimard, 1989
 Les Folies Françaises – Gallimard, 1988
 Le Cœur Absolu – Gallimard, 1987
 Paradis 2 – Gallimard, 1986
 Portrait du Joueur – Gallimard, 1984
 Femmes – Gallimard, 1983
Women – Columbia UP, 1990
 Paradis – Seuil, 1981
 H – Seuil, 1973
 Lois – Seuil, 1972
 Nombres – Seuil, 1966
 Drame – Seuil, 1965
Event – Red Dust, 1987
 Le Parc – Seuil, 1961
 The Park – Red Dust, 1986
 Une Curieuse Solitude – Seuil, 1958
A Strange Solitude – Grove Press, 1959

Interviews
Contre-attaque – Grasset, 2016
L'Évangile de Nietzsche – Cherche Midi, 2006
 Poker (interviews with Ligne de risque)- Gallimard, 2005
 Voir écrire (with Christian de Portzamparc) – Calmann-Levy, 2003
La Divine Comédie – Desclée de Brouwer, 2000
Le Rire de Rome – Gallimard, 1992
Vision à New York – Grasset, 1981
Entretiens avec Francis Ponge – Seuil, 1970

Translations in English
 Casanova the Irresistible – University of Illinois Press, 2016
 H – Equus Press, 2015
 Mysterious Mozart – University of Illinois Press, 2010
Writing and Seeing Architecture (with Christian de Portzamparc) – University Of Minnesota Press, 2008
 Watteau in Venice – Scribner's, 1994
 Women – Columbia University Press, 1990
 Event – Red Dust, 1987
 The Park – Red Dust, 1986
 Writing and the Experience of Limits – Columbia University Press, 1983
 A Strange Solitude – Grove Press, 1959

Influences and tributes
 Sollers appears as a character in Philip Roth's Operation Shylock (1993), Michel Houellebecq's novel Atomised (1998) and several novels by Marc-Édouard Nabe, including L'Homme qui arrêta d'écrire (2010). 
 His writings inspired the eponymous Japanese rock band Sollers.
 A character based on Sollers features in Laurent Binet's 2015 novel La Septième Fonction du langage (Grasset), translated into English as The Seventh Function of Language (2017).

Notes

Further reading and literary criticism
 Roland Barthes, Writer Sollers, 1979
 Jacques Derrida, Dissemination, 1983
 Julia Kristeva, Polylogue, 1977
 Michel Foucault, Distance, aspect, origine : Philippe Sollers, Critique n° 198, November 1963
 Malcolm Charles Pollard, The novels of Philippe Sollers : Narrative and the Visual, 1994
 Philippe Forest, Philippe Sollers, 1992
 Eric Hayot, Chinese Dreams: Pound, Brecht, Tel Quel, 2004
 Hilary Clarke, The Fictional Encyclopaedia: Joyce, Pound, Sollers, 1990
 Alex Gordon,‘Roland Barthes’ Sollers Ēcrivain and the Problem of the Reception of Philippe Sollers’ L’écriture percurrente’, Journal of the Institute of Humanities, Seoul National University, No. 48, February 2002, pp. 55–83.
 Sade's Way, Sollers on Sade, video documentary on ParisLike, 2013 (ISSN 2117-4725)

External links

1936 births
Living people
People from Talence
ESSEC Business School alumni
French editors
French literary critics
20th-century French novelists
21st-century French novelists
French literary theorists
French Roman Catholic writers
20th-century French philosophers
21st-century French philosophers
Postmodern theory
Chevaliers of the Légion d'honneur
Prix Médicis winners
French male essayists
French male novelists
20th-century French essayists
21st-century French essayists
Prix Fénéon winners
20th-century French male writers
21st-century French male writers
French magazine founders